The Youth Are Getting Restless is a live album from hardcore punk and reggae pioneers Bad Brains. It was recorded at the Paradiso Theater in Amsterdam, the Netherlands, in 1987 by the VPRO. The show was part of the band's I Against I tour. It remains one of the group's best selling albums.

The album captures Bad Brains in concert at the height of their commercial and critical peak, featuring a diverse mix of hardcore punk, mellow reggae, funk, and heavy metal. Two of the reggae tracks are cover songs: Dennis Brown's "Revolution," and a rearranged medley of the Rolling Stones's "She's a Rainbow" and The Beatles's "Day Tripper."

Critical reception
The New York Times wrote that the album is a "virtual greatest-hits collection, played with blistering intensity and engineered with its muscle intact."

Track listing
 "I" – 2:33
 "Rock for Light" – 1:40 
 "Right Brigade" – 2:30 
 "House of Suffering" (Paul Hudson, Gary Miller) – 2:04 
 "Day Tripper/She's a Rainbow" (Lennon–McCartney/Jagger–Richards) – 4:53
 "Coptic Times" – 2:10 
 "Sacred Love" (Hudson, Darryl Jenifer, Miller) – 3:27
 "Re-Ignition" (Hudson, Jenifer, Miller) – 4:30
 "Let Me Help" (Hudson, Jenifer, Miller) – 1:54
 "The Youth Are Getting Restless" – 3:58
 "Banned in D.C." – 2:14
 "Sailin' On" – 1:52
 "Fearless Vampire Killers" – 1:12
 "At the Movies" – 2:50
 "Revolution" (Dennis Brown) – 4:27
 "Pay to Cum" – 1:41
 "Big Takeover" – 3:26
All songs composed by Bad Brains except where noted.

Personnel

 H.R. – vocals
 Dr. Know – guitar
 Darryl Jenifer – bass
 Earl Hudson – drums

References

Bad Brains live albums
1987 live albums
SST Records live albums